Military aid to the civil authorities (MACA) is the collective term used by the Ministry of Defence of the Government of the United Kingdom to refer to the operational deployment of the armed forces of the United Kingdom in support of the civilian authorities, other government departments and the community as a whole. Commander Home Command is the standing joint commander responsible for the planning and execution of civil contingency operations within the UK landmass and territorial waters during any military aid to UK civil authorities.

Scope
There are three criteria for the provision of MACA:
 Military aid should always be the last resort. The use of mutual aid, other agencies, and the private sector must be otherwise considered as insufficient or be unsuitable.
 The civil authority lacks the required level of capability to fulfil the task and it is unreasonable or prohibitively expensive to expect it to develop on.
 The civil authority has a capability, but the need to act is urgent and it lacks readily available resources

Legal considerations
All operations must be conducted within both civil and military law. Failure to comply with this principle may result in criminal or civil law proceedings being brought against individuals or the MOD. Unlike the police and some other civil agencies, members of the armed forces (during peacetime) have no powers over and above those of ordinary citizens. They have the same personal duty as anyone else to abide by the law at all times.

Types of assistance
MACA encompasses four types of assistance:
Military aid to other government departments
Military aid to the civil power
Military aid to the civil community
Training and logistic assistance to the civil power

Military aid to other government departments
Military aid to other government departments covers assistance provided by the armed forces to urgent work of national importance or in maintaining supplies and services essential to the life, health and safety of the community, such as Operation Fresco during the 2002-2003 UK firefighter dispute. MAGD is controlled under orders made under section 2 of the Emergency Powers Act 1964.

Military aid to the civil power
Military aid to the civil power encompasses the provision of military assistance (armed if necessary) in its maintenance of law, order and public safety using specialist capabilities or equipment in situations beyond the capability of the civil power. This includes capabilities such as explosive ordnance disposal and mountain rescue (where it is provided by the Royal Air Force Mountain Rescue Service)

Military aid to the civil community
Military aid to the civil community encompasses the provision of unarmed military assistance to prevent or deal with the aftermath of a natural disaster or a major incident or, to assist civil sponsors either by carrying out special projects of significant social value to the community or by attaching individual volunteers to specific projects.

History

Examples of MACA being utilized include:
 Operation Fresco during the 2002-2003 UK firefighter dispute
 Operation Pitchpole during the 2013–14 United Kingdom winter floods
 Operation Shaku during the 2015–16 Great Britain and Ireland floods
 Operation Bridled following the collapse of Didcot power station in 2016.
 Operation Temperer following the Manchester Arena bombing and the Parsons Green train bombing in 2017
 2018 United Kingdom wildfires
 2019–20 United Kingdom floods
 Operation Rescript during the COVID-19 pandemic in the United Kingdom
Storm Arwen in December 2021 
 Operation Isotrope (2020-present) in response to the English Channel migrant crossings (2018–present)

See also
 Iranian Embassy siege
 Winter of Discontent

References

Military of the United Kingdom
Law enforcement in the United Kingdom